Liga Deportiva Universitaria de Quito's 1997 season was the club's 67th year of existence, the 44th year in professional football, and the 37th in the top level of professional football in Ecuador.

Kits
Supplier: Umbro
Sponsor(s): Volvo, Autosueco

Squad

Competitions

Serie A

First stage

Group 2

Results

Second stage

Results

Aggregate Table

Liguilla Final

Note: Includes bonus points earned in previous stages: Barcelona (3); D. Quito & LDU Quito (1).

Results

Inauguration of Casa Blanca
Built between 1995 and 1997, the stadium hosted its first match on March 6 in a friendly game between LDU Quito and Atlético Mineiro of Belo Horizonte.

References
RSSSF - 1997 Serie A

External links
Official Site 
Estadio Rodrigo Paz Delgado 
LDU Quito (4) - Emelec (1)
ESPOLI (1) - LDU Quito (1)
LDU Quito (1) - D. Quito (1)
D. Quevedo (2) - LDU Quito (4)
Olmedo (1) - LDU Quito (1)
LDU Quito (2) - Olmedo (0)
LDU Quito (5) - D. Quevedo (0)
D. Quito (1) - LDU Quito (2)
LDU Quito (3) - ESPOLI (1)
LDU Quito (3) - Aucas (1)
LDU Quito (2) - Calvi (0)
Deportivo Quevedo (0) - LDU Quito (2)
LDU Quito (1) - Emelec (1)
D. Quito (1) - LDU Quito (1)
LDU Quito (2) - Técnico Universitario (1)
LDU Quito (4) - ESPOLI (0)
Olmedo (0) - LDU Quito (2)
LDU Quito (2) - Deportivo Cuenca (0)
ESPOLI (2) - LDU Quito (2)
LDU Quito (2) - Barcelona SC (0)
LDU Quito (4) - Olmedo (1) 3rd goal
LDU Quito (3) - Barcelona SC (2) 3rd goal

1997